Scott Pethtel is an American football coach.  He served as the head football coach at North Park University in Chicago for seven seasons, from 2006 to 2012, compiling a record of 10–60.  While at North Park, he grew the team from 30 players to around 90 players and increased average grade point average from 1.95 to 2.89.

Pethtel resigned his position at North Park on November 16, 2012.  He then served as head football coach at Brookstone School, a private school in Columbus, Georgia.  On May 23, 2017, Pethtel was hired as the head football coach of Muncie Central High School, in Muncie, Indiana.

Head coaching record

College

References

Year of birth missing (living people)
Living people
Adrian Bulldogs football coaches
Ball State Cardinals football coaches
Buffalo Bulls football coaches
Cincinnati Bearcats football coaches
North Park Vikings football coaches
High school football coaches in Georgia (U.S. state)
High school football coaches in Indiana